Kheyrabad (also Romanized as Kheyrābād; also known as Kheir Abad Bahabad) is a village in Jolgeh Rural District, in the Central District of Behabad County, Yazd Province, Iran. At the 2006 census, its population was 178, in 39 families.

References 

Populated places in Behabad County